T'aet'an-pihaengjang Airport is an airport in Taetan, Hwanghae-namdo, North Korea.  It is sited in a valley approximately 42 km west-northwest of Haeju.

Facilities 
The airfield has two concrete runways that are nearly parallel.  Runway 10L/28R measures 8170 x 131 feet (2490 x 40 m) and runway 10R/28L measures 9220 x 79 feet (2810 x 24 m).  A single taxiway extends from the end of 28L, then turns south and splits into two taxiways which access underground aircraft shelters.

References 

Airports in North Korea
South Hwanghae